Mitogen-activated protein kinase kinase kinase 7-interacting protein 2 is an enzyme that in humans is encoded by the MAP3K7IP2 gene.

The protein encoded by this gene is an activator of MAP3K7/TAK1, which is required for the IL-1 induced activation of nuclear factor kappaB and MAPK8/JNK. This protein forms a kinase complex with TRAF6, MAP3K7 and TAB1, thus serves as an adaptor linking MAP3K7 and TRAF6. This protein, TAB1, and MAP3K7 also participate in the signal transduction induced by TNFSF11/RANKL through the activation of the receptor activator of NF-kappB (TNFRSF11A/RANK), which may regulate the development and function of osteoclasts. Mutations in MAP3K7IP2 have been associated with human congenital heart defects.

Interactions 

MAP3K7IP2 has been shown to interact with:

 HDAC3, 
 TAB1, 
 MAP3K7IP3,
 MAP3K7, 
 NFKB1, 
 NUMBL, 
 Nuclear receptor co-repressor 1, 
 TRAF2,  and
 TRAF6.

References

Further reading

External links